The Ukrainian national government (Ukrainske Derzhavne Pravlinnia (UDP); Ukrainian State Board) of 1941 was a brief self-proclaimed Ukrainian  government established on the Ukrainian territories occupied by Nazi Germany. The government was established by the 30 June 1941 Act of restoration of the Ukrainian state. It was led by the Stepan Bandera's faction of OUN.

History

On 22 June 1941 leaders of the OUN met in Kraków, occupied Poland, and established a plan to create a Ukrainian state. The leaders of this meeting, Vsevolod Petriv and Volodymyr Horbovy, sent a letter to Adolf Hitler offering cooperation in exchange for Ukrainian independence.

With the beginning of Operation Barbarossa the German army entered Lviv and the Ukrainian People's Militia organized by OUN-B initiated the first of two violent pogroms. Henryk Szyper reported that "German and Ukrainian flags were hung out everywhere" to welcome German troops, and the population "expected that a Ukrainian state of fascist kind would be established". Many thought that they found a new ally in Nazi Germany. The leader of the government was Yaroslav Stetsko. Many members were former government officials and military leaders of the Ukrainian People's Republic. However, Germany did not recognise the government; it arrested and imprisoned its members within a matter of weeks.

Government structure
The government of 1941 was an attempt to include as many political parties in Ukraine as possible. The structure and nomenclature of the government functionaries were quite extensive. They included:

The Prime Minister was Yaroslav Stetsko

Deputy Prime Minister and Secretary of the Ministry of Health – Marian Panchyshyn – no political affiliation
Deputy Prime Minister – Lev Rebet (OUN)
Minister of the Interior – Volodymyr Lysy (Socialist Radical Party)
Minister of External Affairs – Volodymyr Stakhiv
Minister of Defence – Vsevolod Petriv (Social Revolution Party)
Minister of State Security – Mykola Lebed (OUN)
Minister of Justice – Yulian Fedusevych
Minister of Agriculture – Yevhen Khraplyvy
Minister of Health Marian Panchyshyn (no political affiliation)
Minister of Education Volodymyr Radzykevych (no political affiliation)
Minister of Communication N. Moroz (no political affiliation)
Minister of Information Oleksandr Hai-Holovko (no political affiliation)
Minister of Political Coordination Ivan Klymiv-Lehenda (OUN)
Deputy Minister of Interior Konstantyn Pankivsky (Socialist Radical Party)
Deputy Minister of External Affairs Oleksandr Maritchak (Ukrainian National-Democratic Party)
Deputy Minister of Defense Roman Shukhevych (OUN)
Deputy Minister of Defense Oleksandr Hasyn (OUN)
Deputy Minister of Justice Bohdan Dzerovych (no political affiliation)
Deputy Minister of Agriculture Andriy Piasetsky (Front of National Unity)
Deputy Minister of Health Roman Osinchuk

The government also featured a Council of Seniors, which was headed by Kost Levytsky.

References

1941 in Ukraine
1941
Organization of Ukrainian Nationalists
Ukrainian independence movement
Ukraine in World War II
Modern history of Ukraine
Political history of Ukraine
1941 in politics
1941 establishments in Ukraine
1941 disestablishments in Ukraine
Ukrainian collaborators with Nazi Germany
Former republics